Hansborough is a locality along the former Morgan railway line adjacent to the Thiele Highway, in South Australia's Mid North region. It is situated 9 kilometres south-west of Eudunda and 18 kilometres north-east of Kapunda. The Light River runs through the locality.

A town was surveyed in July 1865 and named after Frederick Hansborough Dutton (1812–1890), an early pastoralist and an overlander, who founded Anlaby Station, near Kapunda.  It was declared as ceasing to exist on 13 August 1936. Boundaries were created for the part of the locality within the Light Regional Council on 16 March 2000 and for the part within the Regional Council of Goyder which includes the ceased Government Town of Hansborough on 24 August 2000.

The Hundred of Neales School, later Freshwater Creek School, opened in 1927 in a former manager's residence on the Kingscourt property and closed in 1940.

The 2016 Australian census which was conducted in August 2016 reports that Hansborough had a population of 42 people.

See also
David Moody (politician)

References

Ghost towns in South Australia